State Street Sweet is an album by the Gerald Wilson Orchestra recorded in 1994 and released on the MAMA label.

Reception

AllMusic rated the album with 4½ stars; in his review, Scott Yanow noted: "this edition of the Gerald Wilson Orchestra is quite strong but it is the leader's colorful and distinctive arrangements that give the band its personality. Recommended".

Track listing 
All compositions by Gerald Wilson except where noted.
 "State Street Sweet" - 2:46	
 "Lake Shore Drive" - 6:04	
 "Lighthouse Blues" - 7:48	
 "Come Back to Sorrento" (Ernesto De Curtis) - 5:19	
 "The Serpent" - 4:03	
 "The Feather" - 5:54	
 "Caprichos" - 6:28	
 "Jammin' in C" - 8:47	
 "Carlos" - 6:35	
 "Nancy Jo" - 2:21

Personnel 
Gerald Wilson - arranger, conductor
Ron Barrows (track 9), Bob Clark (tracks 3, 4 & 6-9), George Graham (tracks 1-5 & 10), Tony Lujan (tracks: 1, 2 & 5-10), Bobby Shew (tracks 3 & 6-9), Frank Szabo (tracks 1-5 & 10),  Snooky Young -trumpet 
Thurman Green (tracks 1-5 & 10), Alex Iles (tracks 6-9), Charlie Loper, Ira Nepus - trombone
Maurice Spears - bass trombone
John Stephens, Randall Willis - alto saxophone
Plas Johnson (track 4), Carl Randall, Louis Taylor - tenor saxophone
Jack Nimitz - baritone saxophone
Brian O'Rourke - piano
Eric Otis (tracks 3 & 7), Anthony Wilson - guitar 
Trey Henry - bass 
Mel Lee - drums

References 

Gerald Wilson albums
1995 albums
Albums arranged by Gerald Wilson
Albums conducted by Gerald Wilson